Markéta Červenková (born 20 August 1991) is a Czech athlete specialising in the shot put. She represented her country at two European Championships without qualifying for the final. In addition, she won a bronze medal at the 2016 European Throwing Cup.

Her personal bests in the event are 17.05 metres outdoors (Kladno 2018) and 16.66 metres indoors (Jablonec nad Nisou 2016).

International competitions

References

External links
 
  (archived)
 
 
 

1991 births
Living people
Czech female shot putters
Czech Athletics Championships winners
Athletes (track and field) at the 2020 Summer Olympics
Olympic athletes of the Czech Republic